Planed Plant ("Children's Planet") was a strand of Welsh-language television programming for children broadcast by S4C. It first aired on 1 November 1982.

Background
Planed Plant included imported animated programmes such as Yu-Gi-Oh!,  Sabrina, Horseland and Dennis and Gnasher are dubbed into Welsh. It' also featured a number of Welsh-produced programmes.  Uned 5, the channel's flagship youth magazine show, was often introduced by Planed Plant until April 2005 when the programme moved to a new prime-time slot.

Until 26 October 2007 production of Planed Plant was in-house. This was replaced by a service from independent production company Boomerang. As part of the changes, the previous presentation team (Alex Jones, Mari Grug, Alun Williams) were replaced by a new team of announcers/presenters. Newcomers Geraint Hardy and Meleri Williams began presenting the 4-6pm strand for older children (Planed Plant). Williams left the presentation strand after eleven months and was replaced by Lois Cernyw and Tudur Phillips.

Planed Plant was shown on S4C weekdays between 16.00 & 17.00 on analogue and 16:00 & 18:00 on digital. In 2010, S4C replaced it with a similar children's block called Stwnsh.

Slot Meithrin on 17 September 1990 until 16 September 1998, Planed Plant (pre school version) on 17 September 1998 until December 2001 and Planed Plant Bach ("Small Children's Planet"), the services for nursery age children, were replaced by Cyw ("Chick") on 23 June 2008.

Service  
 Clwb S4C (1 November 1982 – 14 September 1990) 
 Slot Meithrin (17 September 1990 – 16 September 1998) 
 Slot 23 (17 September 1990 – 30 April 1994) 
 5 Pump (5 September 1994 – 16 September 1998) 
 Planed Plant (17 September 1998 – 23 April 2010) 
 Planed Plant Bach (14 October 1998 – 22 April 2008) 
 Cyw (23 April 2008 – present)
 Stwnsh (26 April 2010 – present)

Presenters 
Continuity presenters in the past include:

Branwen Gwyn
Elain Edwards
Lisa Gwilym
Sarra Elgan
Rhydian Bowen Phillips
Glyn Wise (as a guest presenter)
Alex Jones
Mari Grug
Alun Williams
Rhodri Owen

Programmes  
Clwb Winx (2004–2009) 
Siôn Blewyn Coch (1986) (1986)

See also
Síle – Similar strand of programmes on Irish language channel TG4

References

External links
 Official Planed Plant site
 Press release with details on presentation changes
 Stwnsh

British children's television series
S4C original programming
Television channels in Wales
Television programming blocks in Europe